Peterborough Castle, also known as Mount Thorold and Touthill, was a medieval motte and bailey castle in Peterborough, Cambridgeshire, England.

Details

Peterborough Castle was built by Abbot Thorold of Peterborough, a Norman appointed to the post by William the Conqueror. A motte and bailey design was erected close to the cathedral, in what is now the Dean's garden. Thorold built the castle to protect himself against the monks in the cathedral, during the turbulent post-conquest period. The castle was destroyed by the 12th century abbot, Martin de Bec.

Today only the motte survives of the castle and is now between ten and twelve metres high. The castle has scheduled monument status.

See also
Castles in Great Britain and Ireland
List of castles in England

Bibliography
Armitage, Ella. (1912) The Early Norman Castles of the British Isles. London: John Murray.

References

Castles in Cambridgeshire
Buildings and structures in Peterborough